Warmia (Latin: Varmia, Warmia; ; Warmian: Warńija; ; Old Prussian: Wārmi) is both a historical and an ethnographic region in northern Poland, forming part of historical Prussia. Its historic capitals were Frombork and Lidzbark Warmiński and the largest city is Olsztyn.

Warmia is currently the core of the Warmian-Masurian Voivodeship (province). Important landmarks include the Cathedral Hill in Frombork, the bishops' castles at Olsztyn and Lidzbark, the medieval town of Reszel and the sanctuary in Gietrzwałd, a site of Marian apparitions. Geographically, it is an area of many lakes and lies at the upper Łyna river and on the right bank of Pasłęka, stretching in the northwest to the Vistula Bay. Warmia has a number of architectural monuments ranging from Gothic, Renaissance and Baroque to Classicism, Historicism and Art Nouveau.

Warmia is part of a larger historical region called Prussia, which was inhabited by the Old Prussians and later on was populated mainly by Germans and Poles. Warmia has traditionally strong connections with neighbouring Masuria, but it remained Catholic and belonged directly to Poland between 1454/1466 and 1772, whereas Masuria was a part of Poland as a fief held by the Teutonic Order and Ducal Prussia, which became predominantly Protestant. Warmia has been under the dominion of various states over the course of its history, most notably the Old Prussians, the Teutonic Knights, the Kingdom of Poland and the Kingdom of Prussia. The history of the region is closely connected to that of the Archbishopric of Warmia (formerly Prince-Bishopric of Warmia). The region is associated with the Prussian tribe, the Warmians, who settled in an approximate area. According to folk etymology, Warmia is named after the legendary Prussian chief Warmo, and Ermland derives from his widow Erma.

History

Early times 

By the early Middle Ages the Warmians, an Old Prussian tribe, inhabited the area.

Beginning of the Northern Crusades 
In the 13th century the area became a battleground in the Northern Crusades. Having failed to gather an expedition against Palestine, Pope Innocent III resolved in 1207 to organize a new crusade; beginning in 1209, he called for crusades against the Albigenses, against the Almohad dynasty of Spain (1213), and, also around that time, against the pagans of Prussia. The first Bishop of Prussia, Christian of Oliva, was commissioned in 1209 to convert the Prussians, at the request of Konrad I of Masovia (duke from 1194 to 1247).

Teutonic Order 
In 1226 Duke Konrad I of Masovia invited the Teutonic Knights to Christianize the pagan Prussians. He supplied the Teutonic Order and allowed the usage of Chełmno Land (Culmerland) as a base for the knights. They had the task of establishing secure borders between Masovia and the Prussians, with the assumption that conquered territories would become part of Masovia. The Order waited until they received official authorisation from the Empire, which Emperor Frederick II granted by issuing the Golden Bull of Rimini (March 1226). The papal Golden Bull of Rieti from Pope Gregory IX in 1234 confirmed the grant, although Konrad of Masovia never recognized the rights of the Order to rule Prussia. Later, the Knights were accused of forging these land grants.

By the end of the 13th century the Teutonic Order had conquered and Christianized most of the Prussian region, including Warmia. The Teutonic Order recruited mostly German-speaking settlers to develop the land. The new régime reduced many of the native Prussians to the status of serfs and gradually Germanized them. . Native Prussians were also reported as holders of estates. Over several centuries the colonists, native Prussians and immigrants gradually intermingled. Until the early 13th century, also the southern parts of Warmia were German-speaking. Polish settlers arrived later, particularly after 1410, mainly to the south of Warmia, so that German was replaced by Polish in this area.

In 1242 the papal legate William of Modena set up four dioceses, including the Archbishopric of Warmia. From the 13th century new colonists, mainly Germans, settled in the Monastic State of the Teutonic Knights incl. Warmia. The bishopric was exempt and was governed by a prince-bishop, confirmed by Emperor Charles IV. The Bishops of Warmia were usually Germans or Poles, although Enea Silvio Piccolomini, the later Pope Pius II, served as an Italian bishop of the diocese.

After the 1410 Battle of Grunwald, Bishop Heinrich Vogelsang of Warmia surrendered to King Władysław II Jagiełło of Poland, and later with Bishop Henry of Sambia gave homage to the Polish king at the Polish camp during the siege of Marienburg Castle (Malbork). After the Polish army moved out of Warmia, the new Grand Master of the Teutonic Knights, Heinrich von Plauen the Elder, accused the bishop of treachery and reconquered the region.

Kingdom of Poland 

In February 1440 the nobility of Warmia and the town of Braniewo (Braunsberg) co-founded the Prussian Confederation, which opposed Teutonic rule, and most towns of the Warmia joined the organization in May 1440. In February 1454, the organization asked Polish King Casimir IV Jagiellon to incorporate the region to the Kingdom of Poland, to which the king agreed and signed the act of incorporation in Kraków on 6 March 1454, and the Thirteen Years' War (1454–1466) broke out. During the war Warmia was recaptured by the Teutonic Knights, however, in 1464 Bishop Paweł Legendorf vel Mgowski sided with Poland and the Prince-Bishopric came again under the overlordship of the Polish King. In the Second Peace of Thorn (1466) the Teutonic Knights renounced any claims to Warmia, and recognized Polish sovereignty over the region, which was confirmed to be part of Poland. It was administratively remained a Prince-Bishopric with several privileges, part of the larger provinces of Royal Prussia and Greater Poland Province.

Soon after, in 1467, the Cathedral Chapter elected Nicolas von Tüngen against the wish of the Polish king. The Estates of Royal Prussia did not take the side of the Cathedral Chapter. Nicholas von Tüngen allied himself with the Teutonic Order and with King Matthias Corvinus of Hungary. The feud, known as the War of the Priests, was a low scale affair, affecting mainly Warmia. In 1478 Braniewo (Braunsberg) withstood a Polish siege which was ended in an agreement in which the Polish king recognized von Tüngen as bishop and the right of the Cathedral Chapter to elect future bishops, which however would have to be accepted by the king, and the bishop as well as Cathedral Chapter swore an oath to the Polish king. Later in the Treaty of Piotrków Trybunalski (7 December 1512), conceded to the king of Poland a limited right to determine the election of bishops by choosing four candidates from Royal Prussia. The region retained autonomy, governing itself and maintaining its own laws, customs, rights and German language.

Warmia was invaded by the Teutonic Knights during the Polish–Teutonic War of 1519–1521, however, the Poles, led by renown astronomer Nicolaus Copernicus, repulsed the Teutonic siege of Olsztyn in 1521. Copernicus spent more than half of his life in Warmia, where he wrote many of his groundbreaking works and conducted astronomical observations and mathematical calculations, which became the basis for his heliocentric model of the universe. After the war of 1519–1521, he coordinated the reconstruction and resettlement of the devastated southern Warmia.

In 1565, Cardinal Stanislaus Hosius founded the Collegium Hosianum in Braniewo, which became the leading institution of higher learning in the region.

After the Union of Lublin in 1569, the Duchy of Warmia was integrated more directly into the Polish Crown within the Polish–Lithuanian Commonwealth. At the same time, the territory continued to enjoy substantial autonomy, with many legal differences from neighbouring lands. For example, the bishops were by law members of Polish Senat and the land elected MP's to the Sejmik resp. Landtag of Royal Prussia as well as MP's to the Sejm of Poland.
Warmia was under the Church jurisdiction of the Archbishopric of Riga until 1512, when Prince-Bishop Lucas Watzenrode received exempt status, placing Warmia directly under the authority of the Pope (in terms of church jurisdiction), which remained until the resolution of the Holy Roman Empire in 1806.

Prussia and Germany 
By the First Partition of Poland in 1772, Warmia was annexed by the Kingdom of Prussia; the properties of the Archbishopric of Warmia were secularized by the Prussian state. In 1773 Warmia was merged with the surrounding areas into the newly established province of East Prussia. Ignacy Krasicki, the last prince-bishop of Warmia as well as Enlightenment Polish poet, friend of Frederick the Great (whom he did not give homage as his new king), was nominated to the Archbishopric of Gniezno (and thus Primate of Poland) in 1795. After the last partition of Poland and during his tenure as Primate of Poland and Prussian subject he was ordered by Pope Pius VI to teach his Catholic Poles to 'stay obedient, faithful, and loving to their new kings', Papal brief of 1795. The Prussian census in 1772 showed a total population of 96,547, including an urban population of 24,612 in 12 towns. 17,749 houses were listed and the biggest city was Braunsberg (Braniewo).

Between 1773 and 1945 Warmia was part of the predominantly Lutheran province of East Prussia, with the exception that the people of Warmia remained largely Catholic. Most of the population of Warmia spoke High Prussian German, while a small area in the north spoke Low Prussian German; southern Warmia was populated by both Germans and Polish Warmiaks. The Polish population was subjected to intense Germanisation policies. Warmia was divided into four districts (Kreise) - Allenstein (Olsztyn), Rössel (Reszel), Heilsberg (Lidzbark Warmiński) and Braunsberg (Braniewo). The city of Allenstein was separated from the Allenstein district in 1910 and became an independent city.

In 1871, along with the rest of East Prussia, Warmia became part of the German Empire. In 1873, according to a regulation of the Imperial German government, school lessons at public schools inside Germany had to be held in German, as a result the Polish language was forbidden in all schools in Warmia, including Polish schools already founded in the sixteenth century. In 1900 Warmia's population was 240,000. In the jingoistic climate after World War I, Warmian Poles were subject to persecution by the German government. Polish children speaking their language were punished in schools and often had to wear signs with insulting names, such as "Pollack".

After the First World War in the aftermath of the East Prussian plebiscite, carried when Red Army was marching on Warsaw - Polish–Soviet War in 1920, the region remained in Germany following a plebiscite in which 97% of residents voted in favor of remaining in Germany. Support for joining Poland was minimal even in Catholic Warmia, except for the Allenstein (Olsztyn) district where such support was quite high.

Despite German hostility, the Poles founded numerous Polish organizations in Warmia in the interbellum. Persecution of Poles intensified after the Nazi Party rose to power in Germany. Due to severe persecution, from 1936 Polish organizations carried out their activities partly in conspiracy. Polish organizations were heavily invigilated by the Sicherheitspolizei (German security police) through its undercover agents, known as the Vertrauensmänner. Based on their information, the German police compiled files and lists of Poles who were supposed to be either executed or imprisoned in Nazi concentration camps. Nazi militants carried out attacks on Polish schools, organizations, printshops, shops. The persecution of Poles further intensified in 1939. In early 1939, many Polish activists were expelled. Afterwards, in an attempt to rig the results of an upcoming census and understate the number of Poles in the region, the Germans terrorized the Polish population, attacked Polish schools and organizations, and confiscated Polish pre-census information leaflets. In summer 1939 the German terror against the Poles even exceeded the terror from the period of the 1920 plebiscite. Poles were subjected to expulsions and arrests, there were terrorist attacks on Polish organizations and schools, Polish libraries were looted or destroyed, and entire volumes of Polish press were confiscated. In August 1939, Germany introduced martial law in the region, which allowed for even more blatant persecution of Poles. In August and September 1939, the Germans carried out mass arrests of Poles, including activists, teachers, school principals, bank employees, newspaper editors, entrepreneurs, priests, scout leaders, and the consul and employees of the Polish Consulate in Olsztyn, and shut down or seized Polish newspapers and libraries. Arrested Poles were mostly deported to concentration camps, incl. , Soldau, Stutthof, Sachsenhausen, Gusen and Ravensbrück. During World War II, many Poles from the region were forcibly conscripted into the Wehrmacht. The Germans operated a notable Nazi prison in the town of Barczewo (Wartenburg) with several forced labour subcamps in the region.

Polish Republic 
Following Germany's defeat in World War II, and the Yalta Conference and Potsdam Conference of 1945, Warmia became again part of Poland as part of the so-called Recovered Territories, pending a final peace conference with Germany which eventually never took place. The German inhabitants either fled or were transferred to Germany by Soviet and communist authorities installed in Poland and the remaining Polish inhabitants were joined by Polish settlers, many of whom were displaced from former eastern Poland annexed by the Soviet Union.

Olsztyn is the largest city in Warmia and the capital of the Warmian-Masurian Voivedeship. During 1945–46, Warmia was part of the Okreg Mazurski (Masurian District). In 1946 a new voivodeship was created and named the Olsztyn Voivodeship, which encompassed both Warmia and Masurian counties. In 1975 this voivodeship was redistricted and survived in this form until the new redistricting and renaming in 1999 as Warmian-Masurian Voivodeship. The Catholic character of Warmia has been preserved in the architecture of its villages and towns, as well as in folk customs.

The most precious historic heritage sites of Warmia are the Lidzbark Castle, the main seat of the Prince-Bishops of Warmia, and Frombork Cathedral, the bishopric's cathedral. Both objects are listed as Historic Monuments of Poland.

Cities and towns

Gallery

People

 Nicolaus Copernicus (1473 in Toruń – 1543 in Frombork), mathematician and astronomer
 Stanislaus Hosius (1504 in Krakow – 1579 in Capranica), Polish writer and diplomat, Bishop of Warmia
 Marcin Kromer (1512 in Biecz – 1589 in Lidzbark Warmiński), Polish cartographer, diplomat and historian, personal secretary of Kings of Poland, Bishop of Warmia
 Regina Protmann (1552 in Braunsberg – 1613 in Braunsberg), Polish Roman Catholic, founder of the Sisters of Saint Catherine
 Andrzej Chryzostom Załuski (1650 – 1711 in Dobre Miasto), Polish translator, prolific writer, Bishop of Warmia
 Ignacy Krasicki (1735 in Dubiecko – 1801 in Berlin), leading Polish Enlightenment poet
 Antoni Blank (1785 in Olsztyn – 1844 in Warsaw), Polish painter 
 Hugo Haase (1863 in Allenstein – 1919 in Berlin), German socialist politician, jurist and pacifist
 Feliks Nowowiejski (1877 in Wartenburg – 1946 in Poznań), Polish composer, conductor, concert organist and music teacher
 Maximilian Kaller (1880 in Bytom – 1947 in Frankfurt on Main), Roman Catholic Bishop of Warmia
 Erich Mendelsohn (1887 in Allenstein – 1953 in San Francisco), Jewish German architect, known for expressionist architecture
 Hans-Jürgen Wischnewski (1922 in Allenstein – 2005 in Cologne), German SPD politician
 Rainer Barzel (1924 in Braunsberg – 2006 in Munich), German CDU politician
 Georg Sterzinsky (1936 in Warlack – 2011 in Berlin), German cardinal of the Roman Catholic Church and the Archbishop of Berlin

See also
Prince-Bishopric of Warmia
Archbishopric of Warmia
Bishops of Warmia

References

 Erwin Kruk, "Warmia i Mazury", Wydawnictwo Dolnośląskie, Wrocław 2003,

External links
 Ermland, Heilsberg, Culm, Riesenburg, Samland bishoprics on 1615 list of Imperial Offices (Ordines Imperii)
  Region of Warmia 
  Warmia and Masuria
  Catholic Ermlanders page
 ca. 1547 map of Prussia including Warmia
 Heilsberg Epicopate Warmia in Prussia map of 1755 
 

Geography of Warmian-Masurian Voivodeship
Regions of Poland
Subdivisions of Prussia